Love Is Like a Spinning Wheel is the twelfth studio album by American country artist Jan Howard. It was released in March 1972 on Decca Records and was produced by Owen Bradley. The album spawned two singles that became minor hits on the Billboard country songs chart. It was one of Howard's final studio albums for the Decca label before departing the label within a year's time.

Background and content
Love Is Like a Spinning Wheel was recorded in several sessions between August 1971 and January 1972. All sessions were recorded at Bradley's Barn, a studio owned by Howard's producer Owen Bradley. Howard had been collaborating with Bradley since first signing with Decca Records in the mid 1960s. The album was recorded with The Nashville A-Team of musicians whom had been featured on all of Howard's releases with the label. These musicians included Harold Bradley, Floyd Cramer and Buddy Harman. The album consisted of 11 tracks that were new recordings as well as cover versions of previously-recorded songs. Among its cover versions was the folk murder ballad "Banks of the Ohio", Sonny & Cher's "All I Ever Need Is You" and Charley Pride's "Kiss an Angel Good Morning". Its second track, "The One You Slip Around With", was previously a single and major hit released by Howard 10 years prior. The song was co-written by Howard's former husband Harlan Howard.

Release and reception

Love Is Like a Spinning Wheel was released in March 1972 via Decca Records in a vinyl record format. Six songs were included on the A-side, while five songs were included on the B-side of the record. The album peaked at number 40 on the Billboard Top Country Albums chart in April 1972. It would be Howard's final album release to reach a Billboard chart position. Love Is Like a Spinning Wheel also included 2 singles that would become minor hits on the Billboard country songs chart. Its first single, the title track, peaked at number 36 on the Hot Country Singles chart in February 1972. Its second single, "Let Him Have It", peaked at number 43 on the same chart in July 1972. Additionally, the title track would become a major hit in Canada, reaching number 14 on the RPM Country Singles chart.

In 1971, Billboard Magazine highlighted Howard's title track and the album itself. Writers commented, "Just to set the record straight, it was Jan Howard's "Love Is Like a Spinning Wheel" which went over so big in Cincinnati and not Bill Anderson's. Bill in fact, thinks so much of Jan's ability that he's given her equal billing on their next duo album.

Track listing

Personnel
All credits are adapted from the liner notes of Love Is Like a Spinning Wheel.

Musical and technical personnel
 Harold Bradley – guitar
 Owen Bradley – producer
 Kenneth Buttrey – drums
 Jimmy Capps – guitar
 Floyd Cramer – piano
 Ray Edenton – guitar
 Buddy Harman – drums
 Jan Howard – lead vocals
 Roy Huskey – bass
 Robert Lockart – design
 Hal Rugg – steel guitar
 Pete Wade – guitar

Chart performance

Release history

References

1972 albums
Jan Howard albums
Albums produced by Owen Bradley
Decca Records albums